The John Cena–Randy Orton rivalry was a professional wrestling storyline within WWE, pitting the two wrestlers as enemies. Initially beginning in 2007, the two had an on-off rivalry up to 2014, with the pair booked to appear in the main event of several pay-per-view events, and often competing for the WWE Championship.

Though the matches between the two received praise, the rehashing of the feud received criticism from some critics for being slightly repetitive and stale. It remains one of the longest and most memorable rivalries in both men's career and WWE history.

Beginning of the rivalry (2007-2008) 
On the July 23, 2007, episode of Raw, Randy Orton interfered and attacked the WWE Champion John Cena after Cena's match that night. Shortly after, Executive Assistant Jonathan Coachman announced Orton as the new number-one contender for the WWE Championship. Cena and Orton faced off at SummerSlam, with Cena winning the match. On August 27, during Cena's match with Booker T on Raw, Orton attacked Cena causing a disqualification. Orton then attacked Cena's father who was sitting at ringside by punt-kicking him and seriously injuring him. Cena and Orton faced each other at Unforgiven, where Cena intentionally disqualified himself by aggressively attacking Orton during and after the match. Cena tortured Orton with his signature submission move - the STFU while allowing Cena's father who recovered from his injuries to kick Orton in the head.

After the match, Coachman booked the two in a Last Man Standing match for the WWE Championship at No Mercy to settle the personal rivalry without any restriction. On the September 17 episode of Raw, Orton tied up Cena at the corner of the ring and forced Cena's dad to face him in a match which Orton easily won. The rivalry ended prematurely after Cena suffered a legitimate torn pectoral muscle during a match with Mr. Kennedy which took Cena out of action for months and forced him to vacate the WWE Championship. Orton was awarded the title at No Mercy.

Cena reignited the rivalry upon returning and winning the 2008 Royal Rumble match, challenging Orton for the title at No Way Out instead of WrestleMania 24. During the match, Orton got himself intentionally disqualified, therefore he did not lose the title. The following night on Raw, Cena once again got an opportunity for the WWE Championship, defeating Orton for a title opportunity in a match where Triple H was the special guest referee. A triple threat match took place between Orton, Cena, and Triple H at WrestleMania 24, and Orton won the match. At Backlash, a fatal four-way elimination match took place between Cena, Orton, Triple H, and JBL. During the match, Orton eliminated Cena, who had previously eliminated JBL. However, Triple H then eliminated Orton to win the match. This temporarily halted the rivalry.

Renewing the rivalry (2009)
In July 2009, Cena challenged Triple H and Orton in a triple threat match for the WWE Championship at Night of Champions. At the event, Orton pinned Cena to retain the WWE Championship. This reignited the feud, and various segments were held where the events from 2007 and 2008 were brought up and The Legacy, a villainous stable led by Orton consisting of Ted DiBiase Jr. and Cody Rhodes attacked Cena on numerous occasions. This eventually led to a match at SummerSlam, and Orton won once again. On the August 31 episode of Raw, Cody tricked Cena into believing he betrayed The Legacy, and Cody's father Dusty arranged a match between Orton and Cody with Cena as a special guest referee. But during the match Cody betrayed Cena, and along with Orton and DiBiase, attacked Cena. However, Cena gained another opportunity to face Orton, this time in an "I Quit" match at WWE Breaking Point. During the match after a brutal brawl, Orton handcuffed Cena and threw water at him. But Cena was eventually able to break free of the handcuff and tied up Orton with the handcuff while simultaneously applying his STF submission hold. Unable to break free of the situation, Orton was forced to quit, meaning Cena won the match; it is considered by 411Mania writer Evan Daniels to be the best match between the duo.

Orton got his rematch in a Hell in a Cell match at the inaugural PPV event of the same name. In the match, Orton defeated Cena to win back the WWE Championship. On the October 5 edition of Raw, Cena challenged Orton to one last rematch for the title in a 60-minute Iron Man match where the competitor with the most decisions at the end of that time would be named the victor. To accept the challenge, Orton added two more conditions to the match; if Cena lost, he would leave Raw, and the match would be "anything goes", conditions which Cena accepted. They also declared that after this match, they will no longer be able to face each other for the WWE Championship, and they would settle their differences for good. The match took place at Bragging Rights. During the match, The Legacy attacked Cena, but Kofi Kingston came to his aid and drove out the Legacy, leaving Cena and Orton one on one. Cena ultimately defeated Orton 6–5, making Orton tap out for the final fall using the STF. Despite not being able to face each other for the championship again, Orton and Cena once more faced off on the December 14 special episode of Raw to receive the Slammy Award for the "Superstar of the Year 2009" in a tournament final, with Cena victorious. This halted the rivalry for nearly four years.

End of the rivalry (2013-2014)

In 2013, Orton was a part of the group The Authority and feuded with fan-favorite wrestler Daniel Bryan, which ended at Hell in a Cell, with Orton beating Bryan and winning the WWE Championship. Also at the event, Cena defeated Alberto del Rio to win the World Heavyweight championship. In December, the feud was reignited after Cena suggested that there should only be "one world champion" in WWE. The leader of the Authority, Triple H, arranged a championship unification Tables, ladders, and chairs match (TLC) match between the two for the December 15 TLC event. During the event, Orton defeated Cena to unify the championships. The rivalry continued, with Orton once again attacking Cena's father in January 2014.

Orton and Cena faced each other again for the unified WWE World Heavyweight Championship at Royal Rumble in a match Orton won after Cena was distracted by The Wyatt Family. On the February 10 episode of Raw, Cena said the feud with Orton would conclude following their main event match, noting that the fans wanted change in the form of wrestlers such as Daniel Bryan. At the Elimination Chamber event in February, Cena was one of the six participants in the Elimination Chamber match competing for Orton's WWE World Heavyweight Championship but was once again attacked by The Wyatt Family, whose interference helped Orton eliminate Cena. The rivalry between Cena and Orton once again momentarily halted as Cena focused his attention on The Wyatt Family, while Orton renewed his rivalry with Bryan.

The renewed rivalry between the two was described as a "tired rehash" by Bleacher Report. SB Nation was equally as critical, noting that while the matches were consistently good, the rivalry and trash-talk between the pair "lacks some bite". Speaking to the Liverpool Echo in 2014, wrestler Cesaro said he was "sick of seeing John Cena against Randy Orton for the 500th time", noting according to his opinion the fans' desire to see new wrestlers and fresh content.

Later that year, Cena and Orton were scheduled to face off at the Hell in a Cell PPV event, in their second Hell in a Cell match on October 26, 2014. Cena went on to defeat Orton; it was their tenth and final one-on-one match on PPV, ending their historic rivalry.

Reception
In 2021, WWE released a list of John Cena's top 10 rivalries, ranking Orton as his number one rival. In 2022, Indian gossip website Pinkvilla said the feud "was arguably one of the greatest rivalries in WWE history".

Aftermath
Three years after the end of the rivalry, in early 2017, the pair had their last one-off televised match to date on the February 7 episode of SmackDown, which Cena won. Their last match to date was the main event of an untelevised live event on February 11, 2017, in which Cena defended the WWE Championship in a winning effort. Five years later in 2022, Cena paid tribute to Orton on the 20th anniversary of his début, declaring his "utmost respect" for Orton's achievements as a wrestler, and his "genuine love and admiration" as a person. Speaking to TMZ in the same year, Orton named Cena as a possibility to induct him into the WWE Hall of Fame after his retirement.

References

Individual rivalries in sports
Professional wrestling rivalries
History of WWE
2007 in professional wrestling
2009 in professional wrestling
2014 in professional wrestling
Professional wrestling in the United States